Matthew T. Scott was an American agriculturist and real estate operator during the 19th century. Born and raised in Kentucky he attended college at Centre College also in Kentucky. After college he spent several years tending to his father's lands in Ohio. He then journeyed to Central Illinois to develop prairie land into farmland as well as build houses. While doing this he created and developed the city of Chenoa. He also developed the McLean County Coal Company with Adlai Ewing Stevenson I. Scott also was the founder of the Bloomington Bulletin a Democratic daily newspaper. He died in Bloomington in 1891.

Early life 
Matthew Thompson Scott Jr. was born February 24, 1828, in Lexington, Kentucky, as the fourth son to a wealthy banker Matthew T Scott Sr. Matthew T Scott Sr. was president of the Northern Bank of Kentucky. The Scott family was of Scotch-Irish descent who was a direct descendant from the old Covenanter hero, Robert Scott, a member of the Lower House of the Parliament of Scotland. Robert Scott lived during the latter part of the 10th century and fought at the Battle of Bothwell Bridge.

College and early career 
Matthew T Scott Jr. attended Centre College in Lexington, Kentucky, and graduated in 1846. During his time at Centre College he met his soon-to-be wife Miss Julia Green. Julia Green was daughter of the Centre College president Rev. Lewis W. Green. They would marry in 1859.

After college he headed north to manage his family's land in Ohio. The base of what Matthew T Scott's personal holdings were a tract of land near the present town of Chenoa, Illinois.

Development of Chenoa 

In 1855 news of the Toledo, Peoria and Western Railway extending through Chenoa to intersect with the current Chicago and Alton Railroad, Scott began to plat the city of Chenoa. He established the first trackside grain storage facility in northern McLean County. He also launched the most extensive advertising campaign ever seen in Central Illinois of that time, to promote the development of his town. He dug a cistern and offered to stake a quarter interest in a steam-powered mill. He also donated land for a church and burial sites. He also built his personal house in 1855 known today as the Matthew T. Scott House.

By 1890 50 tenants were farming  of Scott's land, most of it being in Central Illinois.

Later career and death 

In 1867 Matthew T Scott founded the McLean County Coal Company in conjunction with Adlai E. Stevenson I. Mclean County Coal Company was the most successful coal mine in McLean County. He also established the Bloomington Bulletin which was a Democratic Daily newspaper based in Bloomington, Illinois.

Matthew T Scott died May 21, 1891. He is buried in the city he loved and developed.

References 

1828 births
1891 deaths
Centre College alumni
People from Lexington, Kentucky
People from Chenoa, Illinois